Chrysoliocola elegans is a species of scarab beetles.

References

External links 

 
 Chrysoliocola elegans at insectoid.info

Cetoniinae
Beetles described in 1938